Sharḥ Qaṭr al-Nadā wa-Ball al-Ṣadā  is an Arabic grammar book written by Ibn Hisham al-Ansari (1309 – 1360 CE) for learning the Arabic language.

Presentation
Sharḥ Qatr al-Nada is a book on Arabic grammar written by Ibn Hisham al-Ansari, one of the main scholars of the Arabic language.

The book consists of an original and an explanation of the same author, so the original is a body Qatr al-Nada, and the commentary is an explanation of the same body.

It is considered one of the grammatical references in teaching students the Arabic language.

Contents
The book includes most of the grammar chapters closely similar to the book , in terms of subtraction and arrangement of titles, but it is less detailed than it, in a way that makes it more suitable for the reader and the learner, in the middle stages of education.

See also
 Arabic grammar

References

Arabic grammar
14th-century Arabic books
Arabic grammar books